Mohammad Hidhir bin Sabran (born 29 May 1997) is a Malaysian professional footballer who plays as a winger for Kuching City, on loan from Kedah Darul Aman.

Club career

Kedah
On 9 September 2017, Hidhir made his first-team debut for  2017 season coming on as a substitute for Syazuan Hazani in the 75th minute of 2–0 win at Darul Aman.

Career statistics

Club

Honours

Club
Kedah 
 Malaysia FA Cup: 2019

References

Living people
1997 births
Malaysia Super League players
Malaysia Premier League players
Kedah Darul Aman F.C. players
PDRM FA players
People from Kedah
Malaysian people of Malay descent
Malaysian footballers
Association football wingers